Oliver Rhoe Thornton (born 10 September 1979) is a Welsh stage actor and singer who is best known for his contributions to musical theatre in London's West End.

Life and career

Early life 
Thornton was born on 10 September 1979 in Abergavenny, Monmouthshire, Wales. Whilst at school, he discovered an interest in performing and studied classical ballet from an early age. He gained further acting experience with the Abergavenny Amateur Operatic Society (AAODS), which celebrated its 100th anniversary in 2011.

Training 
Thornton began performing in South Wales, where he studied classical ballet, before completing a BA Honours degree in Musical Theatre from Mountview Academy of Theatre Arts.

Theatre 
Thornton's stage credits include:
 Mark (Rent) – Duke of York's Theatre
 Raoul (The Phantom of the Opera) – Her Majesty's Theatre
 Enjolras (Les Misérables) – Palace Theatre and Queen's Theatre
 Harrison (Chicago) – Adelphi Theatre
Rusty the Steam Engine (Starlight Express) – UK tour
CB the Red Caboose (Starlight Express) – Bochum, Germany
Adam (Felicia) (Priscilla Queen of the Desert) – Palace Theatre
 Adam (Children of Eden) Gala Charity Concert – Prince Of Wales Theatre
 Frank N Furter (Richard O’Brien’s Rocky Horror Show) – UK tour
 Aladdin (Aladdin) – New Wimbledon Theatre
 King Arthur (Camelot) – Two River Theater, New Jersey
 Avi (Moses Man) – Alice Griffin Jewel Box Theatre, Off-Broadway
 Claude (Hair) – Wells Fargo Pavilion, Sacramento
 Bianca (Taming of the Shrew) – Shakespeare Theater Company, Washington, DC
Thornton has also sung with theatreland's first supergroup, Teatro (Sony BMG), during their live performances throughout England and Europe.

Filmography 
2004 - De-Lovely as a member of chorus
2010 - Godforsaken as Leo
2016 - Blood Prose as Sebastian Arden (short film)
2017 - The Only Living Boy in New York as part of a gay couple
2018 - Madam Secretary, episode "The Magic Rake" as reporter #1

Private life 
Thornton is openly gay.

Awards and nominations 

|-
|rowspan="2" style="text-align:center;"|2010
|rowspan="2" style="text-align:center;"|Adam (Felicia) in Priscilla Queen of the Desert
|Whatsonstage.com Theatregoers' Choice Award for "Best Supporting Actor in a Musical"
|
|-
|BroadwayWorld.com UK Award for "Best Featured Actor in a Musical"
|
|-

References

External links 
 

Living people
Alumni of the Mountview Academy of Theatre Arts
Welsh male musical theatre actors
1979 births
21st-century Welsh male actors
People from Abergavenny